The Antrim-Cork rivalry is a hurling rivalry between Irish county teams Antrim and Cork, who first played each other in 1906. The fixture has been an irregular one due to both teams playing in separate provinces. Antrim's home ground is Casement Park and Cork's home ground is Páirc Uí Chaoimh, however, all of their championship meetings have been held at a neutral venue, usually Croke Park.

While Cork are regarded as one of the "big three" of hurling, with Tipperary and Kilkenny completing the trio, Antrim have never claimed the All-Ireland title following just two appearances in the final.

As of 2014 Antrim and Cork have met eight times in the hurling championship with Cork emerging successful on all eight occasions.

History

1943: All-Ireland final meeting

After two shock victories over Galway and Kilkenny, Antrim made history by becoming the first Ulster representatives to line out in an All-Ireland final against Cork on 5 September 1943. The harsh economic realities of the Emergency were recognised before the throw-in as team captains Mick Kennefick and Jimmy Walsh made an exchange of tea and butter. But that was as good as it got for Antrim, as they froze on a day when Cork caught fire. Cork led by 3-11 to 0-2 at the break and by 5-16 to 0-4 at the end. The Rebels had their second three-in-a-row.

2004-2010: Cork continue to dominate

After a fourteen-year hiatus, Antrim and Cork renewed their rivalry on 25 July 2004. Antrim manager Dinny Cahill made some strong comments in the media prior to the game in which he criticised Cork players Brian Corcoran, Niall McCarthy, Tom Kenny and Jerry O'Connor. Right from the throw-in the Cork tempo was furious. Corcoran goaled twice for Cork to give them a commanding 2-13 to 0-3 interval lead. Antrim came close to scoring a goal when a Liam Watson-struck free hit the bottom of the upright in the 60th minute at a time when Cork had extended their lead to sixteen points before eventually winning by 2-20 to 0-10.

Antrim and Cork had their most recent championship clash on 25 July 2010 in an All-Ireland quarter-final. Cork’s opening eight points all came from frees, and by the 25th minute, they had moved into an 0-11 to 0-6 lead. Antrim battled bravely, however, gaps started to open up in the Antrim defence late in the half, allowing Tom Kenny and Kieran Murphy to take advantage and add points. It was in the 35th minute that Aisake Ó hAilpín slipped the ball to Niall McCarthy, and he found the net from close range. Ben O'Connor tagged on a couple of frees, and the Rebels went in at the break with a 1-16 to 0-11 lead. The Saffrons narrowed the gap after the interval through Liam Watson and Neil McManus, however, they finished with fourteen men after Watson was sent off for a second booking, and Cork finished the job with a late salvo of scores to secure a 1-25 to 0-19 victory.

Statistics

All-time results

Legend

Senior

Intermediate

Junior

Under-21

Minor

Top scorers

References

External links
 Cork-Antrim head-to-head results 

Cork
Cork county hurling team rivalries